Giannis Karagiannis (born 25 July 1994), sometimes credited as John Karayiannis, is a Cypriot singer and songwriter who represented Cyprus in the Eurovision Song Contest 2015 with the song "One Thing I Should Have Done". Previously he tried to represent Cyprus in their national final for the Junior Eurovision Song Contest in 2007 and 2008.

Discography

Singles

See also
 Cyprus in the Eurovision Song Contest 2015

References

External links

1994 births
Eurovision Song Contest entrants for Cyprus
21st-century Cypriot male singers
Cypriot pop singers
Eurovision Song Contest entrants of 2015
Greek Cypriot people
Living people
People from Limassol